Michael Menzel is a prolific game artist and occasional game designer from Germany.  As the designer of Legends of Andor, he won the Kennerspiel award.

Menzel is credited as an artist for over 300 board games or game items.  He is known for creating beautiful, detailed art for game boards.

Games for which Michael Menzel has provided artwork include the following:
2004 Jambo
2006 Shogun
2006 The Pillars of the Earth
2006 Thurn and Taxis
2007 Cuba
2008 Dominion
2008 Stone Age
2009 Havana
2010 Catan, 2010 and later editions
2012 Legends of Andor

References

External links
 Michael Menzel: boardgamegeek.com artist entry
 Michael Menzel Wikipedia page (German)

Living people
Board game designers
German artists
Year of birth missing (living people)